KSMR (92.5 FM) is a non-commercial educational radio station broadcasting a Catholic radio format. Licensed to Winona, Minnesota, United States, it serves the Saint Mary's University campus and entire Winona area. It first began broadcasting under the call sign KSMW. The station is currently owned by Real Presence Radio.

History
The original name of the station was KSMW (signifying Saint Mary's Winona), and was started by Brother J. Raymond Long, FSC (a De La Salle Christian Brother) along with Brother Patrick Callahan and Dr. David O. Thomas.

These three men were instrumental in the development of KSMW/KSMR as the campus radio station for Saint Mary's University of Minnesota, then known as Saint Mary's College.  At the beginning, KSMW was basically a dead station, which could only be heard in certain areas on campus.

Then, after the building of a new studio in Heffron Hall, the first voice on the air from the new studio was Dave Filipczak; it was St. Patrick's Day in 1978.  Dave was also the first general manager.  KSMW changed its callsign to KSMR (signifying Saint Mary's Radio) and since at least 2001, the callsign KSMW has been used by Missouri State University, as a repeater in West Plains, MO for KSMU-FM (91.1 FM).

The longest running show on KSMR has been airing continually since January 2003. Originally titled "The Scott and Jeff Show" it starred business faculty Scott Deml and Jeff Hefel. This show ran for five consecutive years on Thursday afternoons from 3PM-5PM.  Well known campuswide for "corny bits" and poor production, the show did some nice charity work raising over $5000 for the local Habitat for Humanity by conducting frequent radio marathons.  Joe Dulak replaced Scott Deml at the end of the 2008 broadcasting year.

Jeff Hefel and Joe Dulak operated as "The Grumpy Old Man Show" for one year and since have titled their show as "The Black Hole of Radio. "  Derek Jackson signed on to act as a third DJ for the 2012-2013 season. Dr. Kyle Black joined the team in 2016. The Blackhole Radio Show is the #1 rated radio show during the 3-5pm hour, on Thursdays, of all licensed radio broadcasts originating from the campus of Saint Mary's.  The show is currently in its 16th season with no plans of slowing down.

KSMR recent history
KSMR was a digital station with a full digital archival of songs as well as electronic reporting methods. KSMR was a student run radio station located on the campus of Saint Mary's University of Minnesota campus in Winona, Minnesota. The KSMR studio was located in the lower-level of the Michael H. Toner Student Center in the center of the Saint Mary's campus.

Every show on KSMR was different according to the taste of the disc jockeys. When no DJs were in studio the station is fully automated, playing music depending on the day.  The music styles heard changed continuously and thus KSMR could easily be classified as a freeform variety station.  Each year, shows changed based on the current student volunteers.

Most of the music heard on KSMR (outside of specific programs) was in the rock, indie, and indie pop styles, and a growing number of top 40 music also played. In October 2013, KSMR updated its music library to play more top 40 music, along with 80's, classic rock, and oldies music in an attempt to become the top variety station in Winona.

During the Christmas season, KSMR played nonstop Christmas depending on the tastes of the committee of students who manage the station instead of other programming, outside of specific radio shows. The station operated a website which allowed for online streaming anywhere in the world this stream was created and set up by students in early 2011.  The logo was introduced in September 2011, replacing a short-lived logo that was used from April 2011 through September 2011.  The station broadcast over the airwaves at 92.5 FM, 94.3 FM, and via streaming audio online at the stations website.

Translator
KSMR, broadcasting on 92.5 FM, is relayed by an additional FM translator to widen its broadcast area on K232CZ 94.3 FM in the greater Winona area.  The programming on 94.3 FM is identical to that of KSMR 92.5 FM.

Current
On April 28, 2019, Saint Mary’s University of Minnesota became the latest institution of higher learning to part ways with its radio broadcasting facilities.

Rather than sell them, however, the school has donated them to a non-profit religious operator.

The recipient of silent KSMR 92.5 and FM translator K232CZ at 94.3 MHz in Winona, Minn., was Real Presence Radio. The donation was consummated on August 31, 2020.

Interestingly, KSMR is licensed for a mere 4 watts; the translator is a 104-watt facility.

The donation of the facilities put an end to over-the-air coverage of the school’s student-run radio station. The end of that programming dates to the start of the 2019-2020 school year. In September, a transmitter malfunction led Saint Mary’s to seek a Silent STA for KSMR and the FM translator.

It remains under the STA.

Logos

References

External links

Christian radio stations in Minnesota
Catholic radio stations
Catholic Church in Minnesota
Winona, Minnesota
Saint Mary's University of Minnesota